The Church of Jesus Christ of Latter-day Saints in Zimbabwe refers to the Church of Jesus Christ of Latter-day Saints (LDS Church) and its members in Zimbabwe. In 1975, there were 689 members in Zimbabwe. In 2021, there were 36,152 members in 91 congregations.

History

Limited missionary contact began in Zimbabwe (what was Southern Rhodesia) in the 1930s, but the first convert was not baptized until 1951. Missionary work was limited until after the church's 1978 Revelation on Priesthood which allowed blacks to hold the priesthood.

Gordon B. Hinckley visited Zimbabwe and spoke to members on February 18, 1998.

In April 2016 Thomas S. Monson announced the Church would build a temple in Zimbabwe.

More than 4,000 people turned out to hear Russell M. Nelson speak on April 17, 2018 during his visit to Zimbabwe.

Stakes
As of February 2023, the following stakes and districts were located within Zimbabwe

Mission
Zimbabwe was part of the South Africa Johannesburg Mission until the Zimbabwe Harare Mission was created in July 1987. In 2018, the mission was split to create the Zimbabwe Bulawayo Mission.

Temples

On April 3, 2016 the Harare Zimbabwe Temple was announced by church president Thomas S. Monson. As of January 4, 2021, the temple was under construction. Once complete it will be dedicated and open for services.

See also

Edward Dube
 Religion in Zimbabwe
 Christianity in Zimbabwe

References

Additional reading
"Zimbabwe—Land of Beauty, People of Faith", Liahona, March 2014

External links
The Church of Jesus Christ of Latter-day Saints Africa Southeast site
The Church of Jesus Christ of Latter-day Saints Official site
Harare Zimbabwe Temple at ChurchofJesusChristTemples.org

 
Zimbabwe